Otho is an unincorporated community in Henry County, Alabama, United States.

References

Unincorporated communities in Henry County, Alabama
Unincorporated communities in Alabama
Alabama populated places on the Chattahoochee River